Cloprostenol is a synthetic analogue of prostaglandin F2α (PGF2α). It is a potent luteolytic agent; this means that, within hours of administration, it causes the corpus luteum to stop production of progesterone, and to reduce in size over several days. This effect is used in animals to induce estrus and to cause abortion.

References 

Veterinary drugs
Cyclopentanes